Nigel Molesworth is a fictional character, the supposed author of a series of books about life in an English prep school named St Custard's.  The books were written by Geoffrey Willans, with cartoon illustrations by Ronald Searle.

The Molesworth books were the result of an approach by Willans to the cartoonist, Searle, to illustrate a series of books based on a column he had been writing for Punch. They appeared in instalments in the children's magazine The Young Elizabethan, described by Molesworth as "the super smashing New Young Elizabethan ahem (advert.)". Searle had grown disillusioned with his (very popular) St Trinian's School series but had promised his publisher Max Parrish another Christmas best-seller.  Searle was initially sceptical about another school-based project but was won over by the examples he was given to read by Willans.  Between the initial publication in 1953 and Willans' death in 1958 (aged 47) three books were completed and most of a fourth (Back in the Jug Agane) written; the Compleet Molesworth anthology was also under way.  The first book, Down with Skool!, was published in October 1953 and by that Christmas had sold, according to Searle, 53,848 copies, surpassing the performance of the previous year's The Terror of St Trinian's.

St Custard's
Nigel Molesworth is a schoolboy at St Custard's, a fictional (and dysfunctional) prep school located in a carefully unspecified part of England. It is ruled with an iron fist by Headmaster "GRIMES" (BA, Stoke-on-Trent), who is constantly in search of cash to supplement his income and has a part-time business running a whelk stall. Other masters include Sigismund Arbuthnot, the "mad maths master", who frequently appears as Molesworth's nemesis in his daydreams.

St Custard's, according to Molesworth, "was built by a madman in 1836". His fellow pupils include Grabber, the head boy and "winner of the Mrs Joyful Prize for Rafia work", whose wealthy father owns a publishing business; Peason, Molesworth's "grate frend" and companion on his frequently imagined interplanetary adventures; Fotherington-Tomas, the school sissy; and Molesworth 2, Nigel's annoying younger brother. The school's traditional local rivals are Porridge Court, who regularly beat St Custard's convincingly in all sporting events.

Molesworth's spelling is consistently poor throughout all the books, as many words are rendered phonetically, including the names of those Molesworth knows. Grimes' name is one of the very few he spells correctly, but he always writes it in all capital letters to signify his fear of him. Regardless, many fans find this feature endearing. The phrase "as any fule kno", appended to many of Nigel's pronouncements, has achieved fame beyond its author and can sometimes be seen in the mainstream British press (usually in a satirical context; the phrase often appears in Private Eye). It was used by J. K. Rowling to end an essay she wrote for Pegasus, the journal of the University of Exeter Department of Classics and Ancient History, reminiscing on her studies there. In fact, Rowling mentions in the essay that she had read the books. (Notably, there is mention of a 'Latin pla' which Molesworth has to read: 'the Hogwarts'. The name also crops up for the headmaster of Porridge Court, who is named 'Hoggwart' in the book.) 
The phrase 'as any fule kno' was also used as the title of a Deep Purple song, "Any Fule Kno That".

The books in the series are, in order of original publication:
 Down with Skool! A Guide to School Life for Tiny Pupils and their Parents (1953)
 How to be Topp: A Guide to Sukcess for Tiny Pupils, Including All There is to Kno about Space (1954)
 Whizz for Atomms: A Guide to Survival in the 20th Century for Fellow Pupils, their Doting Maters, Pompous Paters and Any Others who are Interested (1956)
 Published in the US as Molesworth's Guide to the Atommic Age
 Back in the Jug Agane (1959)
 The Compleet Molesworth (1958)
 Molesworth (2000 Penguin reprint), 

They are part of a British tradition of children's books set at boarding schools (school stories), which includes the Billy Bunter stories, the Jennings novels and most recently the Harry Potter books. Unlike these others, however, the Molesworth books do not consist of linear storylines but rather feature Molesworth's wisdom on a variety of topics as well as his fanciful daydreams. The topics covered extend from boarding-school life to reflections on the culture of 1950s Britain. Television (then still relatively novel to British households), the start of space travel and the atomic age, the Davy Crockett craze and "How to be a young Elizabethan" all feature, as well as more timeless topics such as Christmas, the French, journalism (with "N. Molesworth, Ace Reporter") and "Gurls".

Simon Brett later wrote two sequels to the series in which a grown-up Nigel offered his observations on subjects such as jobs, family, holidays and D.I.Y.
Molesworth Rites Again (1983)
How To Stay Topp  (1987)

The Lost Diaries of Nigel Molesworth

In 2022 Korero Press published the Molesworth diaries that appeared in Punch between August 1939 and December 1942 in one volume titled 
The Lost Diaries of Nigel Molesworth. They were illustrated by Uli Meyer in the style of Ronald Searle.

Major characters
Some of the pupils at St Custard's:
Nigel Molesworth, the self-styled "curse of st custards" and "goriller of 3b".
Molesworth 2, his younger brother. Described by Nigel thus "uterly wet and a weed it panes me to think i am of the same blud". He is called George by a "gurl" in the final book.
Peason, Molesworth's "grate frend". Molesworth and Peason build numerous inventions together. Considering Molesworth's phonetic spelling, it is possible that Peason's name is actually Pearson.
Gillibrand, another of Molesworth's classmates. It is regularly mentioned in passing that his father is a General.
Grabber. Head boy of the School, "captane of everything" (especially "foopball") and "winer of the mrs joyful prize for rafia work". His parents are extremely rich and Molesworth cynically opines that Grabber "could win a brownies knitting badge for the ushual amount".
Basil Fotherington-Tomas. A goody-goody, a wet and a weed. He has curly blond locks and is prone to skip around the school girlishly saying "Hullo clouds, hullo sky". "Aktually it is only fotherington-tomas he sa Hullo clouds hullo sky he is a girlie and love the scents and sounds of nature tho the less i smell and hear them the better."

Some of the staff at St Custard's:
Headmaster GRIMES.  Headmasters "are always very ferce and keep thousands of KANES chiz moan drone". Molesworth always writes his name in all capital letters to signify how seriously he takes him.
Sigismund Arbuthnot, the mad maths master.
The Matron.
Many of the staff are anonymous.

In other media
In 1987 the character was reprised for a four-part BBC Radio 4 series, Molesworth. Written by Simon Brett, the series portrayed Molesworth in middle age, still surrounded by many of the characters from his youth.  Molesworth was played by Willie Rushton, with Penelope Nice as his wife Louise, and Clive Swift as the now aged ex-headmaster Grimes.

In The League of Extraordinary Gentlemen, Volume III: Century, Basil Fotherington-Tomas cameos in Chapter 2 as a member of the band Purple Orchestra.

See also
1066 And All That
Cacography
Radio Malt
St Trinian's School

References

External links
 Review in the London Review of books

Nigel Molesworth
Literary characters introduced in 1953
Characters in British novels of the 20th century
Child characters in literature
Male characters in literature
Comedy literature characters
Fictional characters introduced in 1953